Leng Jun (born 1963) is a Chinese painter who makes hyper realistic paintings and drawings that appear like photographs. He currently serves as the Leader of the Wuhan Painting Academy and Chairman of the Wuhan Artists Association.

Jun is from Sichuan Province, China. He graduated in 1984 from the Teachers College, Hankou, Wuhan, the branch of the Department of Arts.

He was awarded an honorary doctorate from Birmingham City University in 2018.

Publications
Leng Juns Oil Painting Collection Limitation and Freedom. Jilin Fine Arts, 2012. .

See also 

 Chinese painting
 Chinese art

References 

1963 births
Living people
20th-century Chinese painters
21st-century Chinese painters